The lawn bowls competition at the 1962 British Empire and Commonwealth Games took place at the Dalkeith Bowling Club in Perth, Western Australia from 19 November until 1 December 1962. The bowls competition started several days before the official opening of the Commonwealth Games.

Medal table

Medallists

Results

Men's singles – round robin

+Silver play off
Black beat Bradley 21-14

Men's pairs – round robin

+ Bronze medal play off 
Rhodesia & Nyasaland beat England 23-14

Men's rinks (fours) – round robin

+ Silver play off 
Scotland beat Rhodesia & Nyasaland 20-19

References

See also
List of Commonwealth Games medallists in lawn bowls
Lawn bowls at the Commonwealth Games

Lawn bowls at the Commonwealth Games
Brit